Pseudaethomerus maximus is a species of beetle in the family Cerambycidae. It was described by Friedrich F. Tippmann in 1953.

References

Acanthoderini
Beetles described in 1953